The Lightning GT is a battery-electric sports car under development by the Lightning Car Company, a London-based privately owned and funded business.

The project was initially unveiled to the public in July 2008 at the British International Motor Show,  with deliveries originally expected in 2009, but without funding the project has effectively been on hold in recent times. 

The GT was displayed at the 2014 Low Carbon Vehicle Event with Magtec.
The GT was displayed at the London Motor Show in May 2016 as one of the main features and placed in front of the show entrance where anecdotally it received great critical acclaim for its enduring styling.
Most recently the Lightning was in Paris where it was shown by a French manufacturer to their Asian partner with a view to a long term EU and Asia association.

The silver Lightning GT show car has now been accepted for a placement at the British Motor Museum where it will go on display from April onwards. It has been accepted there as it has a special place in British automotive history, arguably it was the leading British pioneer for EV in the 21st century.

Technical details
The car is powered by twin rear-mounted synchronous motors, driving through independent reduction gearboxes under electronic torque control.

Its body will be made from carbon fibre and the chassis from a honeycomb aluminium  structure. This unique H chassis will also house the battery modules which when integrated add massive torsional and beam strength. Final assembly location has yet to be determined.

A small amount of the development of the GT was assisted with a grant from the UK Government's Technical Strategy Board, as part of the EEMS Consortium. The Lightning GT development car excelled as a part of this consortium with 100% drivetrain and battery reliability over a full years monitored testing. The GT covered more miles than the rest of the consortium combined.

Battery 
The standard battery specification includes two 22 kWh Altairnano lithium-titanate battery pack 'strings'. The 9 kW standard onboard charger can fully recharge the batteries in five hours from a dedicated 32amp wired socket or 12 hours from any standard socket. An optional on-board charger connected to a suitable dedicated domestic power source can recharge the car from zero in 2.5 hours. Lightning are developing further battery combinations to take the range further on a standard pack. A range extender option is being developed which will enable significantly longer journeys.

See also
 List of electric cars currently available
 Tesla Roadster (2008)
 Venturi Fétish
 AMG E-Cell

References

External links

 

Electric concept cars
Cars of England
Electric sports cars
Coupés
Cars introduced in 2008
Production electric cars